Ashby v White (1703) 92 ER 126, is a foundational case in UK constitutional law and English tort law. It concerns the right to vote and misfeasance of a public officer.  Lord Holt laid down the important principle that where there is injury in the absence of financial loss (injuria sine damno) the law makes the presumption of damage and that it is sufficient to demonstrate that a right has been infringed.

Facts
Mr Ashby was prevented from voting at an election by the misfeasance of a constable, Mr White, on the apparent pretext that he was not a settled inhabitant.

At the time, the case attracted considerable national interest, and debates in Parliament. It was later known as the Aylesbury election case. In the House of Lords, it attracted the interest of Peter King, 1st Baron King who spoke and maintained the right of electors to have a remedy at common law for denial of their votes, against Tory insistence on the privileges of the House of Commons.

Sir Thomas Powys defended William White in the House of Lords. The argument submitted was that the Commons alone had the power to determine election cases, not the courts.

Judgment
Lord Holt CJ was dissenting from the judgment in the Court of King's Bench, but his dissent was upheld by the House of Lords by a vote of fifty to sixteen. His judgment reads as follows.

See also
Pender v Lushington, per Jessel MR, a statement that a shareholder's vote is a right of property in UK company law.

Notes

References
Watkins v Home Office [2006] UKHL 17
Watkins v Secretary of State for the Home Department [2004] EWCA (Civ) 966, and on appeal to the House of Lords, [2006] UKHL 17 regarding legally privileged correspondence of a prisoner being interfered with.

Election law in the United Kingdom
English tort case law
1703 in law
Lord Holt cases
Constitution of the United Kingdom
1703 in England
Court of King's Bench (England) cases
United Kingdom constitutional case law